Sir Thomas Fitzwilliam (died 4 March 1497) was Speaker of the House of Commons of England in 1489–1490.

He was born into a Lincolnshire gentry family, the son of Thomas Fitzwilliam of Mablethorpe and educated at the Inner Temple.

He was appointed Recorder of Lincoln and elected MP for Lincoln in 1459. In 1467 he was returned as MP for Plympton Earle, then a seat under the control of the Crown. In 1478 he was appointed a serjeant-at-law for the Duchy of Lancaster.

After obtaining a house in Stepney, he was elected a Recorder of London and supported the claim of Richard III to the English throne. He nevertheless welcomed Henry Tudor after the Battle of Bosworth and became more active in government, representing London in King Henry's first parliament. He was knighted in 1486.

In 1489, in Henry's third Parliament, he was elected Speaker of the House, electing to sit as knight of the shire for Lincolnshire.

He died in 1497 and was buried in Mablethorpe church. He had married Margaret Harrington (d. 1498),with whom he had at least three sons, John, George, and William. John predeceased him, and he was succeeded by John's son, another Thomas, who also died young in 1502. The estates then passed to Sir Thomas' second son, George.

References

Oxford DNB Fitzwilliam, Sir Thomas

Year of birth unknown
1497 deaths
People from Mablethorpe
English MPs 1459
Speakers of the House of Commons of England
Serjeants-at-law (England)
Recorders of London
English MPs 1467
English MPs 1485
Members of the Parliament of England for Plympton Erle